is a Japanese professional baseball pitcher for the Oakland Athletics of Major League Baseball (MLB). He previously played in Nippon Professional Baseball (NPB) for the Hanshin Tigers.

Amateur career 
He also pitched for the national team in the 16U(AA) Baseball World Championship. He and his father were avid fans of the Yomiuri Giants.

In 2010, Fujinami entered Osaka Toin High School. In his final year in 2012 he led Tōin as their ace pitcher at the Japanese High School Baseball Invitational Tournament and Japanese High School Baseball Championship, where the school won both competitions. He finished the tournament with a 1.07 ERA in 76 innings, and 90 strikeouts. In the fall, he again pitched for the national team in the 25th 18U(AAA) Baseball World Championship where he recorded a 1.11 ERA in over 24 innings, and got selected into the tournament's Best Nine. In addition, he received the 2012 MVP Award by the International Baseball Federation (IBAF) under the 18 & below category for his exemplary performance for the year.

Professional career

Hanshin Tigers

Fujinami was the number 1 pick of the Tigers, Buffaloes, Marines, and the Swallows in the 2012 Nippon Professional Baseball draft. Hanshin won the four-way lottery and assigned him jersey number 19.

He made his debut on March 31, 2013, the third game of the season and the earliest-ever appearance by a rookie drafted out of high school. He recorded the loss by pitching six innings and allowing both runs in a 2-0 loss against the Tokyo Yakult Swallows at Jingu Stadium.

He was due to make his second start on April 7 against the Hiroshima Toyo Carp but was replaced by Minoru Iwata who was unable to pitch in the rained-out game the day before. Instead, he made his next appearance as a relief pitcher. He made his second start on April 14 against the Yokohama DeNA BayStars and recorded his first professional win, pitching six scoreless innings. Fujinami was the fifth pitcher drafted out of high school in NPB history to record his first pro victory the year after they won a Koshien tournament and the first in that group to also record their first pro victory at Koshien Stadium.  He is also the first pitcher out of high school in franchise history to record their first pro victory at Koshien and the first CL rookie out of high school to record ten or more victories in a season since Yutaka Enatsu in 1967.

Fujinami quickly gained popularity and was the leading vote getter amongst Central League starting pitchers for the 2013 NPB All-Star Series, with more than 96,000 votes. He started the second game of the All-Star series and pitched two scoreless innings. In the top of the sixth inning, he played a prank on Nippon Ham's Sho Nakata, a former senior at Osaka Tōin, by throwing 2 very slow balls over his head, which prompted Nakata to throw his bat and jokingly take a few steps toward the mound. Fujinami ended up striking out Nakata.

He finished his rookie year at 10-6, with 125 strikeouts and a 2.75 ERA in 23 starts.

Fujinami pitched his first career complete game in a July 15 contest against the Dragons with a 13-strikeout effort and only a single run allowed. During a September 15 game against the Carp at Koshien, he hit 157 km/h (98 mph) on the radar gun and set a new personal high and tied the franchise high for velocity. Tomoyuki Kubota set the original record on June 21, 2005. Four days later, he earned his 10th victory of the season and became the first pitcher out of high school to record double-digit wins in his first two NPB seasons since Daisuke Matsuzaka in 1999–2000 (16 and 14 wins). The last pitcher to accomplish the feat in the Central League (and in franchise history) was Yutaka Enatsu in 1967–1968 (12 and 25 wins). In the same game, he recorded his sixth RBI of the season, tying Tetsuro Kawajiri's 1996 record of RBIs by a Hanshin pitcher.

Fujinami totaled 11 victories for the season, with an ERA of 3.53 and 172 strikeouts in 163 innings. His fastball averaged 149.7 km/h, according to Data Stadium, second only to Shohei Ohtani's 152.5 km/h among starters, and he had an 8.2 swinging strike percentage. While his cutter boasts an 18.7% swinging strike rate, his forkball generated an even higher rate of 26.0%, with batters hitting .222 off it. His 2.81 fielding independent pitching (FIP) average was the best in the Central League, while his batting average on balls in play was .335, nearly 30 points above the league average.

2015 marked Fujinami's most successful season yet. His 221 strikeouts led the league by a wide margin. (Teammate Randy Messenger finished second with 194.) Fujinami also led the league with 7 complete games and 4 shutouts after recording just 2 complete games and no shutouts in his first two seasons. He finished tied for second in the league with 14 wins (in 28 starts) against just 7 losses.  His 2.40 ERA ranked fifth in the Central League.  He also set several career bests in 2015, including starts, innings (199), wins, ERA, complete games, shutouts, strikeouts, and strikeouts per 9 innings (10.0)

Fujinami's 2016 season was not as successful as his previous one. In 26 starts, he had just 7 wins against 11 losses with a 3.25 ERA. In 169 innings pitched, he allowed 152 hits, including a career-high 11 home runs. He recorded 176 strikeouts.

Oakland Athletics
On January 13, 2023, Fujinami signed a one-year, $3.25 million contract with the Oakland Athletics of Major League Baseball (MLB).

Playing style
Fujinami has a large frame for a pitcher, listed at 6 ft 6 in and 215 lb. With a three-quarters delivery, he throws a fastball topping out at 101 mph, a splitter, and a solid mid-to-high 80s slider. The splitter has a high whiff rate in his arsenal.

References

External links

1994 births
Living people
People from Sakai, Osaka
Japanese baseball players
Nippon Professional Baseball pitchers
Hanshin Tigers players
2017 World Baseball Classic players
Baseball people from Osaka Prefecture